Juice It Up! is a franchised raw juice and smoothie bar company. It has 89 locations in its chain with plans to expand and open up 13 more in 2017–2018. Juice It Up! delivers real fruit handcrafted fruit and veggie smoothies, fresh squeezed raw juices, acai and pitaya fruit and smoothie bowls, and cold-pressed bottled juices and shots, as well as healthy snacks. Frank Easterbrook is the company's principal owner along with being the president and CEO. The company is based in Irvine, California, and originated in 1995.

History

Frank Easterbrook has been the principal owner, president, and CEO of Juice It Up! since 2001. It was founded in 1995 when its first location in Brea, California opened. He is also the chief executive for Juice It Up!’s management service company, Balboa Brands, Inc.

The company initially began as a juice and smoothie company and has since shifted gears to also offer an expanded line of raw juices to capitalize on the growing interest in juicing.

Beginning in August 2011, Juice It Up! began retrofitting its locations with Raw Juice Bars. This allowed the company to offer additional beverage blends beyond its smoothies that were also healthy and functional, and the first Raw Juice Bar opened in January 2012. It has now been recognized as the company with the most Raw Juice Bars in Orange County, California.

In 2017, Juice It Up! launched its cold-pressed bottled juice and shot line, which features six unique juices and three shots with natural ingredients.

References

External links
 Juice It Up! Official Website

American companies established in 1995
Restaurants established in 1995
1995 establishments in California
Companies based in Irvine, California
Juice bars
Restaurants in Orange County, California
Fast-food chains of the United States
Fast-food franchises